Qualifying for the 2014 FIBA Asia Cup was held to determine the eight teams that will participate in the 2014 FIBA Asia Cup, aside from the host team  and 2013 FIBA Asia Championship winners . Qualification was via FIBA Asia zone, with each zone having an automatic one berth, plus additional berths from the teams' zones of the second and third runners-up in the 2013 FIBA Asia Championship.

Central Asia 
 was Central Asia's representative, but withdrew prior to the tournament. They were not replaced.

East Asia 
 and  qualified automatically by virtue of being the lone registrants in East Asian qualifying.

South Asia 

The 2014 South Asian Basketball Association Championship in Kathmandu, Nepal determined South Asia's qualifier.

Southeast Asia 

The 2014 Southeast Asian Basketball Association Cup in Batam, Indonesia determined Southeast Asia's two qualifiers.

West Asia 
The 2014 West Asian Basketball Association Championship in Amman, Jordan determined South Asia's qualifier. Iran, which has sent in its under-18 team in preparation for the 2014 FIBA Asia Under-18 Championship automatically qualified whether or not they win the tournament by virtue of winning the 2013 FIBA Asia Championship.

|}

References 

Qual
FIBA Asia Challenge